Holy Rosary Church is a Roman Catholic church in the Tejgaon area of Dhaka. It is also known as Tejgaon Church and once popularly called the Japmala Queen Church.  Under this Catholic church has 17,120 Catholics. Fr. Kamal Andreas Corraya is parish priest of this church and Fr. Mintu Lawrence Palma, Fr. Antony Ripon D' Rozario and Fr. Sony Martin Rodrigues are serving there as assistant parish priest. Each Sunday Catholics gather there for Sunday mass and thousands devotee join there.

Construction
Portuguese Augustinian missionaries introduced Christianity in Dhaka. The second church of Dhaka was built in 1677 at Tejgaon. But this one is the oldest example that can be found.

Renovation
The church was renovated three times. In 1714, 1940 and the last renovation was in 2000.

The difference between the width of walls and the parts of the roof suggest that the eastern part of the Church was built later.

Information

Parish Priest   : Fr. Kamal Andreas Corraya 
Assist. Priest  : Fr. Mintu Lawrence Palma
Assist. Priest  : Fr. Antony Ripon D' Rozario
Assist. Priest  : Fr. Sony Martin Rodriques
Catholics       : 17,120 (including Nayanagar, Uttara Banani, Mahakhali and Bhatara)

See also
 Christianity in Bangladesh
 The Portuguese in Dhaka

References

External links
 

Churches in Dhaka
Roman Catholic churches in Bangladesh
Roman Catholic churches completed in 1677